Women & Health is a peer-reviewed healthcare journal established in 1976. It covers research in the field of women's health. The editor-in-chief is Ellen B. Gold (University of California, Davis).

According to the Journal Citation Reports, the journal has a 2015 impact factor of 1.377, ranking it 9th out of 40 journals in the category "Women's Studies" and 86th in the category "Public, Environmental & Occupational Health".

See also 
 List of women's studies journals

References

External links
 
 Women's official Site

English-language journals
Healthcare journals
Publications established in 1976
Taylor & Francis academic journals
Women's health
Works about midwifery